In 1980s and 1990s US politics, the phrase Atari Democrat referred to Democratic legislators who suggested that the support and development of high tech and related businesses would stimulate the economy and create jobs. The term refers to the Atari brand of video game consoles and arcade machines, which was prominent in the 1980s.

Definition
A 1983 San Jose Mercury News article defined Atari Democrats as "smart young congressmen who sought to make the restoration of American business their issue". A 1984 article in The Philadelphia Inquirer defined the term as "a young liberal trying to push the party toward more involvement with high-tech solutions." It also noted that, "Since July 1982, it has appeared in The New Yorker, Business Week, Fortune, Time and ... in The Wall Street Journal." A few years later, in 1989, The New York Times suggested that Atari Democrats, now also known as "Democrats' Greens", were "young moderates who saw investment and high technology as the contemporary answer to the New Deal." The Times also discussed a generation gap which developed during the 1980s between older liberals who maintained an interest in traditional visions of social liberalism and Atari Democrats who attempted to find a middle ground:

Politicians
Specific individuals have been identified with Atari Democrats. Al Gore's "passion for technological issues, from biomedical research and genetic engineering to the environmental impact of the 'greenhouse effect,' linked him with other technological politicians on Capitol Hill known as Atari Democrats." Time magazine noted that Tim Wirth "made a reputation as the typical 'Atari Democrat,' who urges growth and investment in high-technology industries." The New York Times referred to Paul Tsongas as an Atari Democrat, "a member of the young generation of politicians and economists who looked to high technology as a source of jobs and economic growth." Gary Hart also referred to himself as an Atari Democrat and stated, "I was, early on in my Senate career, described as an Atari Democrat. No one would know what that means because there are no more Ataris, but we were among the first - a small group of us to forecast the transition of the economy from industrialized manufacturing to the information age."

See also

Factions in the Democratic Party (United States)
Innovation economics

Notes

1980s in the United States
Factions in the Democratic Party (United States)
Political terminology of the United States
Al Gore
Political metaphors referring to people
Politics and technology